Institut de Statistiques de l'Université de Paris (ISUP, roughly translated as "Paris Institute of Statistics" or literally to "Institute of Statistics of the University of Paris") is a graduate school of statistics based in Paris, in the fifth arrondissement. It offers specializations in actuarial sciences (finance and insurance), biostatistics as well as industry and services. The ISUP is considered one of the most prestigious centers of learning of statistics in France, reflected in the number of job offers received regularly, the strength of its alumni network, and wages offered to its students out of school, which place it in the "top 15-ranked" French Grandes Ecoles
Founded in 1922 by the mathematician Émile Borel, is the oldest and one of the most prestigious schools for statistics in France. The institute is currently affiliated to Sorbonne University and located on the campus of Jussieu.

History

Origin 
The ISUP is the oldest training statistics in France: it was founded in 1922 (by the mathematician Émile Borel) 20 years before the ENSAE and 72 years before the ENSAI.
At the end of the Great War, Émile Borel, one of the greatest mathematicians of his time, was appointed to the Chair of Probability and Mathematical Physics at the University of Paris. So at this time, there is almost no teaching of statistics and the idea of applying mathematics to any specific field arouses contempt "real" mathematicians. Borel is confident that in economy - in Insurance, in particular - there is a demand. This intuition is the basis for the creation of the ISUP 1922. During the thirty years that followed, under the leadership of mathematical leaders, ISUP will initiate the introduction in France, the teaching of statistics and industrial applications, management or Operational Research.

Notable people from ISUP 

 Émile Borel, Academician, fondator and first director
 Maurice Allais, Nobel Prize for Economics 1988, professor at l'ISUP during 21 years
 Georges Darmois, Academician, former director
 Daniel Dugué, Academician, former director, author for Encyclopædia Universalis (Calculation of probability)
 Jean-Paul Benzécri, Normalien, professor at ISUP, initiator of Data analysis
 Gérard Calot, Polytechnician, then student at ISUP, director of l'INED
 Paul Deheuvels, Academician, currently professor
 Dominique Strauss-Kahn, former Director of International Monetary Fund, former student.
 Éric Le Boucher, Director of economy magazine Enjeux-Les Echos.
 Nicholas Georgescu-Roegen, Romanian mathematician, statistician and economist, progenitor of Ecological economics, former student.

The ISUP today 
The current headmaster is Olivier Lopez. Among teachers, traditionally shared with the University of Paris VI or with some ESSEC (partner school) or Dauphine (other actuarial school), several have a worldwide reputation for their research. These include Jean Jacod (the Franco-German Science Award 2008), Paul Deheuvels (a member of the Academy of Sciences), Gérard Biau (2003 prices young statistician of the French Society of Statistics). 
On its website, the administration announced that it received 1,064 job offers in 2007, it represents more than 20 offers per student. The average compensation for hiring students ISUP makes the ISUP among major French schools that offer the best remuneration.

Programs 
ISUP is a 3-year academic.

Core 
 Optimization (mathematics)
 Measure Theory
 Integration theory
 Probability
 Data Analysis 'Univariate and multivariate'
 Statistics
 Software SAS
 Economics
 Stochastic processes
 Linear regression models
 Econometrics
 Inferential statistics
 Corporate finance
 Time series analysis
 Sampling theory
 Non-parametric statistical
 Segmentation and classification

Actuarial Sciences  

 Financial Mathematics
 Insurance Mathematics
 Stochastic Calculus in finance
 Modern Portfolio Theory
 Insurance Regulation
 General insurance
 Life-insurance
 Reinsurance
 Accounting
 Pension Fund

Biostatistic

Industry risks

Research

LSTA 
Most teachers take part in scientific research in the areas of statistics, most often at the Laboratory of theoretical and applied statistics (LSTA). It is a major laboratory of research in statistics thanks to the number and impact of publications. It has 8 professors (including a member of the Academy of Sciences), 10 Lecturers, 20 external and 80 doctoral and post-doctoral students.

See also
 Pierre and Marie Curie University
 Institute of Actuaries of France
 Society of actuaries

External links 
 Official website
 Alumni website
 Site du LSTA, LSTA website
 Laurent Mazliak (2010)  Borel, Fréchet, Darmois: La découverte des statistiques par les probabilistes français. Journal Electronique d'Histoire des Probabilités et de la Statistique December.

Grandes écoles
Schools in Paris
Educational institutions established in 1922
1922 establishments in France
Statistics education
Sorbonne University